Nevriye Yılmaz (born 16 June 1980) is a Turkish retired basketball player. Yılmaz, who grew up in Bulgaria in a Turkish family, moved to İstanbul, Turkey with her parents when she was nine years old.

In 1997, she won the World High School Basketball Championship with Boğaziçi Lisesi.

Career in Europe
She began her basketball career with I.U.S.B.K. (1997–99) and then she played Galatasaray (1999-01) where she won her first Turkish Championship in Turkey.

She moved first to the Greek team Apollon Ptolemaida (2001–02) then later to the Bulgarian team Academic Plovdiv (2002). Yılmaz moved then to Italy to play for Termini Imerese (2002–03), La Spezia Basket (2003–04) and Pool Comense Como (2004–05).

WNBA
Yılmaz is the first Turkish woman to play in the Women's National Basketball Association (WNBA). In 1999, she participated in the Charlotte Sting's training camp, but was released before the season started.  In 2000, she attended the training camp for the now-defunct Miami Sol, but was also released prior to the start of the regular season.  Then in 2003, Yılmaz signed a free agent contract with the Phoenix Mercury and played five games for them.  The following year, 2004, she played seven games for the San Antonio Silver Stars.

Fenerbahçe
In 2005, she returned home to play in Fenerbahçe Istanbul. 

She won 2005 Europe Cup Ribaund Quenn and 2007 EuroLeague Women All-Star player honor.

Galatasaray
On 6 July 2012, she signed a two-year contract with Galatasaray Women’s Basketball Team.

Yılmaz officially announced her retirement from active sport on 24 October 2016.

She won Euroleague cup 2014 with Galatasaray.

National team
She participated at the 2005 Mediterranean Games in Almería, Spain and won a gold medal with Turkey national women's basketball team.

With more than 180 games (188 games until 7 December 2007) played Yılmaz the most capped national player or Turkey. She was a student in the Sports Academy at the Istanbul University.

She participated London Olympic games 2012 and Rio Olympic games 2016.

Honors
Turkish Championship
 Galatasaray Istanbul: 2000, 2014, 2015
 Fenerbahçe Istanbul: 2006, 2007, 2008, 2009, 2010, 2011, 2012
Turkish Cup
Fenerbahçe Istanbul: 2006, 2007, 2008, 2009
Turkish Presidents Cup
Fenerbahçe Istanbul: 2007, 2010
EuroLeague Women 
Galatasaray S.K. (women's basketball): 2014
Eurobasket
National team: 2011 (silver)
All tournament team, Eurobasket Women 2011

See also
Turkish women in sports

References

External links
WNBA Player Profile
Player profile at fenerbahce.org
Player profile at fibaeurope.com

1980 births
Living people
Basketball players at the 2012 Summer Olympics
Basketball players at the 2016 Summer Olympics
Bulgarian emigrants to Turkey
Bulgarian Turks in Turkey
Centers (basketball)
Fenerbahçe women's basketball players
Galatasaray S.K. (women's basketball) players
Olympic basketball players of Turkey
Phoenix Mercury players
San Antonio Stars players
Sportspeople from Plovdiv
Turkish expatriate basketball people in Greece
Turkish expatriate basketball people in Italy
Turkish expatriate basketball people in the United States
Turkish women's basketball players